Mount Canicula is a mountain formed of two rock peaks,  high. It was charted in 1946 by the Falkland Islands Dependencies Survey, and named by them because of the association with Sirius Knoll: Canicula is a synonym of Sirius, the dog star.

Map
 Trinity Peninsula. Scale 1:250000 topographic map No. 5697. Institut für Angewandte Geodäsie and British Antarctic Survey, 1996.

References 

Mountains of Trinity Peninsula